Wyandotte is an unincorporated community in Butte County, California.

A post office operated at Wyandotte from 1859 (having been transferred from Tarr's Ranch) to 1867 and from 1880 to 1915.  The place is named for a group of Wyandotte people who went there prospecting for gold in 1850.

References

Unincorporated communities in California
Unincorporated communities in Butte County, California